The Snow River is a river in the Tasman Region of the South island of New Zealand. It rises at the western end of the Haupiri Range and flows northward before rounding the tip of Kill Devil Spur to join the Slate River. The Slate River is a tributary of the Aorere River, the major river of the northwestern Tasman region.

References

Rivers of the Tasman District
Rivers of New Zealand